Epidendrum subgenus Aulizeum was raised from sectional status by  Lindley in 1853.  According to the Latin diagnosis, this taxon included those species of Epidendrum with a multi-lobate lip adnate to the column, with pseudobulbous stems, with the flowers sessile or born on racemes or panicles.   In his further English description, Lindley stated that the species in this taxon have a horn-like stem which is only leafy at the end, and racemose inflorescences.  In 1861, Reichenbach listed 32 species in this subgenus; of these, Kew recognizes 31 as separate species.

In 2004, Withner and Harding separated the eight species that Lindley had placed in E. subg. Aulizeum into the genus Coilostylis, a change that has not been universally accepted.  Additionally, several species have been moved into other genera, leaving thirteen still in Epidendrum subgenus Aulizeum:

Artorima erubescens (Lindl.) Dressler & G.E.Pollard (1971), listed by Reichenbach on p. 350 as E. erubescens
Coilostylis ciliaris (L.) Withner & P.A.Harding (2004)139, listed by Reichenbach on p. 347 as E. ciliare 
Coilostylis clavata (Raf.) Withner & P.A.Harding (2004)141, listed by Reichenbach on p. 349 as E. clavatum.  Recognized by Kew as E. purpurascens
Coilostylis falcata (Lindl.) Withner & P.A.Harding (2004)143, listed by Reichenbach on p. 348 as E. falcatum
Coilostylis vivipara (Lindl.)Withner & P.A.Harding (2004)146, listed by Reichenbach on pp. 348–349 as E. viviparum
Encyclia kermesina (Lindl.) P.Oriz (1995), listed by Reichenbach on p. 349 as E. kermesinum
Encyclia parallela (Lindl.) P.Ortiz(1995), listed by Reichenbach on p. 351 as E. parallelum
E. coryophorum (Kunth) Rchb.f. (1861), listed by Reichenbach on (p. 347) as E. coriophorum
E. jajense Rchb.f. (1854), listed by Reichenbach on p. 352
E. miserum Lindl. (1841), listed by Reichenbach on p. 354 as E. pulchellum
E. moritzii Rchb.f. (1850), listed by Reichenbach on pp. 350–351
E. oerstedii Rchb.f. (1852), listed by Reichenbach on p. 348 as both E. costaricense and E. oerstedii.
E. polystachyum Kunth (1816), listed by Reichenbach on p. 350.
E. parvilabre Lindl. (1845), listed by Reichenbach on p. 351
E. refractum Lindl. (1843), listed by Reichenbach on p. 354
E. rupestre Lindl. (1841), listed by Reichenbach on p. 352
E. saxatile Lindl. (1841), listed by Reichenbach on p. 352
E. stramineum Lindl. (1853), listed by Reichenbach on p. 351
E. tipuloideum Lindl.(1853), listed by Reichenbach on p. 350
E. volutum Lindl. & Paxton (1852), listed by Reichenbach on p. 354
Oestlundia luteorosea (A.Rich. & Galeotti) W.E.Higgins(2001), listed by Reichenbach on p. 347 as E. seriatum
Prosthechea arminii (Rchb.f.) Withner & P.A.Harding(2004)254, listed by Reichenbach on p. 353 as E. arminii
Prosthechea brachychila (Lindl.) W.E.Higgins (1998), listed by Reichenbach on pp. 352–353 as E. brachychilumProsthechea concolor (Lex.) W.E.Higgins (1998), listed by Reichenbach on p. 352 as E. pruinosumProsthechea grammatoglossa (Rchb.f.) W.E.Higgins (1998), listed by Reichenbach on p. 350 as E. grammatoglossumProsthechea hartwegii (Lindl.) W.E.Higgins (1998), listed by Reichenbach on p. 354 as E. hartwegiiProsthechea lindenii (Lindl.) W.E.Higgins(1998), listed by Reichenbach on p. 353 as E. fallaxProsthechea pastoris (Lex.) Espejo & López-Ferr(2000), listed by Reichenbach on pp. 351–352 as E. venosumProsthechea rhynchophora (A.Rich & Galeotti) W.E.Higgins (1998), listed by Reichenbach on p. 352 as E. rhynchophorumProsthechea sceptra (Lindl.) W.E.Higgins (1998), listed by Reichenbach on p. 353 as E. sceptrumProsthechea serrulata (Sw.) W.E.Higgins (1998), listed by Reichenbach on p. 347 as E. serrulatum''

References 

 
Orchid subgenera